The Nikon 1 S1 is a Nikon 1 series low-cost high-speed mirrorless interchangeable-lens camera launched by Nikon. Nikon lists the estimated selling price of the Nikon 1 S1 One-Lens Kit in the United States at $499.95. This kit comes with the 1 NIKKOR 11–27.5mm f/3.5-5.6 lens.  It features many similarities with the 1 J2, like the same 10.1 megapixel CX-format CMOS sensor and autofocus, but with an upgraded EXPEED 3A processor.

It is the predecessor of Nikon 1 S2 which the newer is a low-cost version of Nikon 1 J4, so has only 14.2MP sensor with less autofocusing points and no touch screen and WiFi, but still has 20fps burst mode as Nikon 1 J4.

Features list 
 Effective Pixels: 10.1 million
 Sensor Size: 13.2mmx 8.8mm
 Image sensor format: CX
 Storage Media: SD, SDHC, SDXC
 15 frames per secondwith AF
 30/60 fps with focus locked on first frame
 ISO Sensitivity: 100-6400
 Manual Exposure Settings(Shutter, Aperture, ISO)
 Audio file format: AAC
 Movie file format: MOV
 Monitor Size: 3.0 in. diagonal
 Monitor Type: TFT-LCD with brightness adjustment
 Battery: EN-EL20 Lithium-ion Battery
 Approx. Dimensions: 4.0 in. (102 mm) x 2.4 in. (60.5 mm) x 1.2 in. (29.7 mm)
 Approx. Weight: 6.9 oz. (197 g)

See also

 Nikon 1 series
 Nikon 1-mount

References 

Nikon MILC cameras
S1
Cameras introduced in 2013